Love is an emotion of strong affection and personal attachment to people and things.

Love may also refer to:

Places

United States
 Love, Kentucky, an unincorporated community
 Love, Mississippi, an unincorporated community
 Love, Cass County, Texas, an unincorporated community
 Love, Swisher County, Texas, an unincorporated community
 Love, Virginia, an unincorporated community
 Dallas Love Field, an airport
 Love County, Oklahoma
 LOVE Park (JFK Plaza), Philadelphia
 Love Township, Vermilion County, Illinois

Other places
 Love (crater), on the far side of the Moon
 Love, Saskatchewan, Canada, a village
 Lõve, Estonia, a village
 Love River, Taiwan

People
 Love (given name), a Swedish first name
 Love (surname)
 Love (footballer) (born 1979), Angolan footballer Arsénio Sebastião Cabúngula

Arts, entertainment and media

Fictional characters
 Love (Bleach), an animated TV series and comics character from Bleach
 Love (Ai Otsuka), a character created by Ai Otsuka
 Foxxy Love, an animated TV series character from Drawn Together
 Love Heart, a character from Sky Love and The King of Fighters
 Love Momozono, a character from Fresh Pretty Cure!
 Love, a character from Thor: Love and Thunder

Films
 Love (1919 American film), starring Fatty Arbuckle
 Love (1919 German film), a German film
 Love (1927 American film), an adaptation of Anna Karenina starring Greta Garbo
 Love (1927 German film), a silent film directed by Paul Czinner
 Love (1952 film), a Swedish film directed by Gustaf Molander
 Love (1956 film), a German-Italian film starring Maria Schell and Raf Vallone
 Love (1971 film), directed by Károly Makk
Love, a 1982 anthology of six vignettes written, directed and produced by women, including three by Mai Zetterling
 Love (1991 film), Indian film starring Salman Khan and Revathi
 Love (1991 Russian film), directed by Valery Todorovsky 
 A Love (1999 film), starring Fabrizio Gifuni
 Love (2004 film), a Kannada feature film directed by Rajendra Singh Babu
 Love (2005 film), directed by Vladan Nikolic
 A Love (2007 film), starring Joo Jin-mo
L-O-V-E, a 2009 Taiwanese anthology of four vignettes, featuring Wilson Chen
 Love (2008 Indonesian film), directed by Kabir Bhatia
 Love (2008 Bengali film), by Indian director Riingo Bannerjee
 Love, a 2008 short film starring Kristina Klebe
 Love (2011 film), directed by William Eubank, with music by Angels & Airwaves
 Love or Amour, a French-language film directed by Michael Haneke
 Love (2012 film), a film directed by Doze Niu
 Love (2015 film), a French film directed by Gaspar Noé
 Love (2020 film), a Malayalam film directed by Khalid Rahman
 Love (2021 film), a Russian film directed by Igor Tverdokhlebov

Video games 
 Love (2008 video game), a platform video game developed by Fred Wood
 Love (2010 video game), a massively multiplayer online role-playing game developed by Eskil Steenberg

Literature
 Love (play), an 1839 play by James Sheridan Knowles
 Love (Carter novel), a 1971 novel by Angela Carter
 Love (manga), a 1993 Japanese manga series by Osamu Ishiwata
 Love (Morrison novel), a 2003 novel by Toni Morrison
 Love (Doyle novel), a 2020 novel by Roddy Doyle

Music

Groups and labels
 Love (band), a 1960s-70s American rock group
 Love (Japanese band), a pop/R&B duo
 Love Records, a Finnish label
 =LOVE, a Japanese idol group

Albums
 Love (Aaron Carter EP), 2017
 Love (Aaron Carter album), 2018
 Love (Angels & Airwaves album), 2010
 Love (Arashi album), 2013
 Love (Ayumi Hamasaki EP), 2012
 Love (Aztec Camera album), 1987
 Love (Beatles album), 2006
 Love (The Cult album), or the title song, 1985
 Love (DramaGods album), 2005
 Love (Edyta Bartosiewicz album), or the title song, 1992
 Love (Flipper album), 2009
 Love (Foetus album), 2005
 Love (Inhabited album), or the title song, 2008
 Love (The Juliana Theory album), 2003
 Love (K-Ci & JoJo album), 2008
 Love (Love album), 1966
 Love (Mika Nakashima album), 2003
 Love (Michael Bublé album), 2018
 Love (Rosemary Clooney album), 1963
 Love (S.E.S. album), or the title song (see below), 1999
 Love (Sesame Street album), or the title song, 1980
 Love (Thalía album), or the title song, 1992
 L.O.V.E (album), by Terri Walker, or the title song, 2005
 L.O.V.E., by Eason Chan, 2018
 L-O-V-E (album), by Nat King Cole, or the title song (see below), 1965
 Love... The Album, by Cliff Richard, 2007
 Love?, by Jennifer Lopez, or the title song (see below), 2011
 Love, by Kelly Chen, 2003
 L.O.V.E. (Life of Valezka & Eko), by Valezka and Eko Fresh, 2004
 The Love Album (Westlife album), 2006
 Love (Jay B EP), 2022

Songs
 "L-O-V-E (Love)", by Al Green
 "L-O-V-E", by Nat King Cole
 "L.O.V.E." (Ashlee Simpson song)
 "L.O.V.E.", by Brown Eyed Girls
 "L.O.V.E.", by Jessie J from the album Who You Are
 "L.O.V.E.", by Sophie from the compilation album Product
 "L.O.V.E.", by VV Brown from the album Travelling Like the Light
 "L.O.V.E.", by Westlife from album Spectrum
 "L.O.V.E. Love", by Orange Juice on the album You Can't Hide Your Love Forever
 "Love" (CNBLUE song)
 "Love" (Disney song), from the film Robin Hood
 "Love" (Inna song)
 "Love" (Jana Kramer song)
 "Love" (John Lennon song)
 "Love" (Kendrick Lamar song)
 "Love" (Keyshia Cole song)
 "Love" (Kid Cudi song)
 "Love" (Lana Del Rey song)
 "Love" (Musiq Soulchild song)
 "Love" (Sasha Son song)
 "Love?" (Donna and Joe song)
 "Love (Can Make You Happy)", by Mercy
 "Love", composed by Ralph Blane and Hugh Martin, first performed by Lena Horne for the film Ziegfeld Follies, 1946
 "Love", by American Authors on the album Oh, What a Life
 "Love", by Benzino on the album Redemption
 "Love", by Charlotte Church on the EP Four
 "Love", by Country Joe and the Fish on the album Electric Music for the Mind and Body
 "Love", by the Cult, the title track of the album Love
 "Love", by Daughter
 "Love", by Def Leppard on the album Songs from the Sparkle Lounge
 "Love", by Destiny's Child from Destiny Fulfilled
 "Love", by Gojira on the album Terra Incognita
 "Love", by Imagine Dragons on the album Origins
 "Love", by Lostprophets on the single "A Town Called Hypocrisy"
 "Love", by Kylie Minogue on the album Golden
 "Love", by Matthew Sweet on the album Earth
 "Love", by Paul Simon on the album You're the One
 "Love", by Petra on the album Beyond Belief
 "Love", by Robyn Hitchcock and The Egyptians on the album Black Snake Diamond Röle
 "Love", by Sara Groves on the album Fireflies and Songs
 "Love", by S.E.S. on the album Be Ever Wonderful
 "Love", by the Smashing Pumpkins on the album Mellon Collie and the Infinite Sadness
 "Love", by Sonata Arctica on the album Pariah's Child
 "Love", by Sonic Dream Collective
 "Love", by Zoé on the album Rocanlover
 "Love?", by Strapping Young Lad from the album Alien
 "(What Is) Love?", by Jennifer Lopez

Radio
 Love 97.2FM, a Singaporean radio station
 LOVE FM 104 - see List of radio stations in Barbados
 Love Radio Network, Philippines

Television
 Love (TV series), a 2016–2018 Netflix original series
 Erotas (TV series) (Greek for "Love"), a Greek soap opera
 The Spirits of Love, or simply Love, a 2006–2008 Taiwanese Formosa TV drama
 "Love" (Death Note episode)
 "Love" (2 Stupid Dogs), an episode of 2 Stupid Dogs

Other uses in arts, entertainment and media
 Love (Alexander Milov sculpture) a sculpture featured at Burning Man
 Love (Cirque du Soleil), a theatrical production
 LOVE (magazine), a bi-annual British style magazine
 Love (image), a pop art image by Robert Indiana
 L.O.V.E. (sculpture), a 2010 sculpture by Maurizio Cattelan in Milan, Italy

Other uses
 Love (horse), thoroughbred racehorse
 Love, one of several names for the number 0 in English
 Zero in the tennis scoring system
 Linguistics of visual English, a version of manually coded English in use North America
 Love-in, a peaceful public gathering focused on meditation, love, music, sex and/or use of recreational drugs.

See also
 
 
 Løve, a surname
 Löve, a surname
 LøVë (disambiguation)
 Love Love (disambiguation)
 Love Love Love (disambiguation)
 Loved (disambiguation)
 Love's, American chain of truck stop and convenience stores 
 Luv (disambiguation)